Athens is an unincorporated community in the now inactive township of Grant in Clark County, Missouri, United States. It is southeast of the Battle of Athens State Historic Site.

History
Athens was laid out and platted in 1844. The community was named for Athens, Greece. A post office called Athens was established in 1841, and remained in operation until 1922.

References

Clark County, Missouri